Sabit Abdulai (born 11 May 1999) is a Ghanaian footballer who plays as a central midfielder for Spanish club SD Ponferradina, on loan from Getafe CF.

Club career
Born in Techiman, Abdulai moved to Spain in 2017 to join Deportivo Alavés, but paperwork issues ruled out the move. He later had trials at Rio Ave FC (where he was also unable to sign a contract due to administrative problems) and UB Conquense, before joining Extremadura UD from Spartans FC in July 2018 on a one-year loan deal, and was assigned to the reserves in Tercera División. Roughly one year later, after being regularly used, he signed a permanent five-year contract with the club.

Abdulai made his first team debut for Extremadura on 4 July 2020, coming on as a second-half substitute for compatriot Emmanuel Lomotey in a 0–1 Segunda División away loss against CD Numancia. He scored his first professional goal sixteen days later, netting his team's only in a 1–5 loss at UD Las Palmas.

On 19 August 2020, Abdulai was loaned to Getafe CF, being initially assigned to the B-team in Segunda División B. He made his La Liga debut with the main squad the following 3 April, replacing Carles Aleñá late into a 0–0 draw at CA Osasuna.

After signing a permanent three-year contract with Geta in 2021, but suffered a serious knee injury in July of that year, being sidelined for eight months. On 8 August 2022, he was loaned to SD Ponferradina in the second division, for one year.

References

External links
 
 

1999 births
Living people
Ghanaian footballers
Association football midfielders
La Liga players
Segunda División players
Segunda División B players
Tercera División players
Tercera Federación players
Extremadura UD B players
Extremadura UD footballers
Getafe CF B players
Getafe CF footballers
SD Ponferradina players
Ghanaian expatriate footballers
Ghanaian expatriate sportspeople in Spain
Expatriate footballers in Spain